Ballynaclin is a townland in the civil parish of Mullingar in County Westmeath, Ireland.

The townland is located to the west of Mullingar town, and to the north of Ballinea. A section of the Royal Canal and the village of Shandonagh are located in the townland.

References 

Townlands of County Westmeath